The following is an alphabetical list of members of the United States House of Representatives from the state of Missouri.  For chronological tables of members of both houses of the United States Congress from the state (through the present day), see United States congressional delegations from Missouri.  The list of names should be complete, but other data may be incomplete.

Current representatives 
 : Cori Bush (D) (since 2021)
 : Ann Wagner (R) (since 2013)
 : Blaine Luetkemeyer (R) (since 2009)
 : Mark Alford (R) (since 2023)
 : Emanuel Cleaver (D) (since 2005)
 : Sam Graves (R) (since 2001)
 : Eric Burlison (R) (since 2023)
 : Jason T. Smith (R) (since 2013)

List of members and delegates 
This is a list of members of the United States House of Representatives from Missouri and non-voting delegates to the House from Missouri Territory. Statehood was granted in 1821.

See also

List of United States senators from Missouri
United States congressional delegations from Missouri
Missouri's congressional districts

Missouri

United States rep